"Perfect Strangers" is a song written by Jonas Fjeld, Astor Anderson, Johnny Sareussen and Mark Spiro. It was performed by Anne Murray and Doug Mallory.  The song reached #19 on the Canadian Adult Contemporary chart and #52 on the U.S. Country chart in 1988 .  The song appeared on Anne Murray's 1987 album, Harmony.

Chart performance

Anne Murray

References

1988 singles
Anne Murray songs
Capitol Records singles
1987 songs